Rawil Menzeleýew (born 1942 in Turkmenistan, USSR) is a Turkmenistan professional football player and manager.

Career
In 1965 he began his professional career for the Soviet First League club Stroitel Aşgabat, in which he played to terminate career in 1974.

In 1999, he, together with Sergei Kazankov coached the Köpetdag Aşgabat, that occurred in a Turkmenistan higher league.

References

External links
 
 Profile at KLISF.ru

1942 births
Living people
Turkmenistan footballers
Soviet footballers
Association football midfielders
FK Köpetdag Aşgabat players
Soviet First League players
Turkmenistan football managers
Soviet football managers
FK Köpetdag Aşgabat managers